Men in White is a TV show starring Adam Rutherford, Basil Singer, and Jem Stansfield. The show revolved around the three scientists who try to solve average, everyday problems.

External links
 
 http://www.channel4.com/science/microsites/M/men_in_white/index.html

2006 British television series debuts
2006 British television series endings
2000s British documentary television series
Channel 4 original programming
Documentary films about science
2000s British television miniseries
English-language television shows